An anathema is something that—or someone who—is detested or shunned.

Anathema may also refer to:

 Anathema (band), a British rock band
 "Anathema", their song on Distant Satellites, a 2014 album
 "Anathema", a song by Twenty One Pilots from the 2011 album Regional at Best
 A Justice League enemy in DC comics

See also
 
 Anathea, a song by Judy Collins from the 1964 album Judy Collins 3
 Anathem, a 2008 science fiction novel by American writer Neal Stephenson
 The Anathemata, a 1952 epic poem by the British poet David Jones